"Mile After Mile" is a song written and composed in 1969 by Canadian singer-songwriter Gerry Joly. It was a 1971-72 hit single for Canadian country singer Orval Prophet. "Mile After Mile" debuted at number 49 on the RPM Country Tracks chart on September 25, 1971. It peaked at number 1 on January 8, 1972. Bobby Hachey covered "Mile After Mile" a few years later.

As a Franco-Ontarian, Joly wrote and sang in both English and French. His French version of the song, "Mille après mille", was made famous by Willie Lamothe and was subsequently recorded by a number of French Canadian artists, including Patrick Norman, Renée Martel, Paul Brunelle, Stephen Faulkner, Laurence Jalbert, Les Respectables and Fred Pellerin. On the 2012 special to promote her new French-language album Sans attendre, Céline Dion performed "Mille après mille" in duet with Pellerin.

Joly wrote "Mile After Mile" when arriving in Elliot Lake after a series of mechanical problems with his car.

Chart performance

References

1969 songs
1971 singles
Orval Prophet songs